Elshad Aliyev (born September 25, 1979 in Baku), better known by his stagename Elşad Xose, is an Azerbaijani rapper. He is the one of the most commercially famous and influential Azerbaijani rappers.

Early career
Aliyev started to provide interested to rap during his school times and chose the nickname Xose. He started to perform as rap duo with Russian rapper Pauk under the name of "D.U" and most of his songs were part of his first album Жизнь не меняется.

Music career

Canlı yayım
In 2002, he released the album called "Canlı yayım", which sold 2500 copies in first 3 days

Personal life
In 2007, Xose was arrested for misdemeanor heroin use and possession. He was sentenced to 1.5 years but later case was cleared.

He was married to Azerbaijani dancer Oksana Rasulova but their relationship ended in divorce.

Albums
Жизнь не меняется (2000)
Canlı yayım (2002)
Plagiat (2003)
Hәr Atdığım Addım (2004)
Ixlas (2005)
Hip-Hop Namә (2008)
Insaf (2011)

References

External links
 Official site
 Unofficial fan site

1979 births
Living people
21st-century Azerbaijani male singers
Musicians from Baku
Azerbaijani rappers